Louis Frommelt (3 May 1943 – 28 February 2005) was a Liechtenstein sports shooter. He competed in the 50 metre rifle, prone event at the 1972 Summer Olympics.

References

1943 births
2005 deaths
Liechtenstein male sport shooters
Olympic shooters of Liechtenstein
Shooters at the 1972 Summer Olympics
Place of birth missing